Garabad or Garrabad may refer to:
 Garabad, Hamadan
 Garabad, Kurdistan
 Garabad, Sarvabad, Kurdistan Province